Pseudomonas reptilivora is a fluorescent, yellow-green, Gram-negative, rod-shaped, non-spore-forming, multiple polar flagellated, motile bacterium that is pathogenic to reptiles. It was originally isolated in Gila monsters (Heloderma suspectum), horned lizards (Phrynosoma solare), and chuckawallas (Sauromalus ater). The type strain is ATCC 14836.

References

Pseudomonadales
Bacteria described in 1940